Michael Duffy (born 1957) is an Australian writer and former editor and publisher. He edited The Independent Monthly, a general magazine owned by Max Suich and John B Fairfax, from 1993 to 1996. Then he and his wife Alex Snellgrove set up a publishing company, Duffy & Snellgrove, that published the first books by Peter Robb, John Birmingham and Rosalie Ham. Other authors included Les Murray, Mungo MacCallum and John Olsen. The company stopped publishing new titles in 2005.

Duffy presented ABC Radio National's Counterpoint with Paul Comrie-Thomson and wrote for News Limited publications and then the Sydney Morning Herald and the Sun Herald until June 2012.

He has written the true crime books Call Me Cruel and Bad, but is best known for the novels The Tower, The Simple Death and Drive By. The latter was described in the Adelaide Review as: "a brilliant mix of reportage drawn from life observation and the novelist’s dramatic touch, to paint a portrait of crime and its effects – grief, confusion, loss, multiple levels of complicity – amongst Sydney’s contemporary Lebanese community."

Books
Man of Honour: John Macarthur: Duellist, Rebel, Founding Father (2003), history 
Latham and Abbott (2004), current politics
The Tower (2009), crime fiction
The Simple Death (2011), crime fiction
Call Me Cruel: A Story about Murder and the Dangerous Power of Lies (2012), true crime
Bad: The True Story of the Perish Brothers and Australia's Biggest Ever Murder Investigation (2012), true crime
Drive By (2013), crime fiction
Sydney Noir: The golden years co-authored with Nick Hordern, 2017
World War Noir: Sydney's unpatriotic war, co-authored with Nick Hordern, 2019

References

1957 births
Living people
Australian journalists
Australian non-fiction crime writers
21st-century Australian novelists